Thomas Alfred Grut (1852–1933) was a Guernsey photographer and author. He published Des lures guernesiaises in 1927, a collection of newspaper columns in Guernésiais. He also translated some of the Jèrriais stories of Philippe Le Sueur Mourant into Guernésiais.

Grut was also one of if not the most noted of all Guernsey photographers in his day. He established his first studio at 2 Victoria Crescent, Victoria Road in St Peter Port in 1879 called the "Central Studio" and later moved his studio to 5 (Le) Pollet Street in St. Peter Port in 1894. During Grut's long and impressive career he captured the portraits of many important citizens and notable persons both of the Channel Islands and other countries. His son Norman Grut took over most of the photography business by 1910.

Norman-language writers
Guernsey writers
1852 births
1933 deaths